Antti Jalmar (Jalmari) Linna (10 July 1891 – 7 April 1954) was a Finnish smallholder and politician, born in Evijärvi. He was a member of the Parliament of Finland from 1919 to 1922, from 1927 to 1945 and again from 1949 to 1951, representing the Social Democratic Party of Finland (SDP). He was the father of Ilmari Linna.

References

1891 births
1954 deaths
People from Evijärvi
People from Vaasa Province (Grand Duchy of Finland)
Social Democratic Party of Finland politicians
Members of the Parliament of Finland (1919–22)
Members of the Parliament of Finland (1927–29)
Members of the Parliament of Finland (1929–30)
Members of the Parliament of Finland (1930–33)
Members of the Parliament of Finland (1933–36)
Members of the Parliament of Finland (1936–39)
Members of the Parliament of Finland (1939–45)
Members of the Parliament of Finland (1948–51)
Finnish people of World War II